Claudio Fernando Graf (born 31 January 1976) is an Argentine football coach and former player who played as a forward.

Career
Born in Bahía Blanca, Graf has played for a number of clubs in Argentina including Liniers de Bahía Blanca, Banfield, Racing Club, Quilmes, Independiente, Colón de Santa Fe, Chacarita Juniors, and Litex Lovech in Bulgaria.

During the Apertura 2004 he scored a goal with his butt for Chacarita Juniors against Club Atlético Independiente. Chacarita Juniors won 3-0 that day. With Lanús he scored a hat-trick against Rosario Central. After that game the club's fans started calling him San Graf (in English: "St. Graf").

In late 2009, he joined Ecuadorian club LDU Quito. He was part of the squad that won the 2009 Copa Sudamericana. In January 2010, he joined Chilean champion Colo Colo, where he played the 2010 Copa Libertadores.
He played with San Martín de San Juan until released in July 2012.

Managerial career
Retiring in 2012, Graf began his coaching career in April 2014, where he was hired as a youth coach in Lanús. In 2016, he joined Talleres in a similar youth coach position.

On 27 September 2018, Graf was appointed assistant coach of Walter Coyette at San Martín de Tucumán. They left the club in February 2019. In September 2019, Graf was once again appointed assistant coach Coyette, this time at Chilean club Unión La Calera. They only lasted until the end of 2019.

In June 2020, Graf followed Walter Coyette to Alvarado, once again as an assistant coach.

Honors
 LDU Quito
 Copa Sudamericana: 2009
 Recopa Sudamericana: 2009

References

External links
 

1976 births
Living people
Sportspeople from Bahía Blanca
Argentine people of Volga German descent
Argentine footballers
Argentine expatriate footballers
Association football forwards
Club Atlético Banfield footballers
Racing Club de Avellaneda footballers
Quilmes Atlético Club footballers
Club Atlético Independiente footballers
PFC Litex Lovech players
Club Atlético Colón footballers
Club Atlético Lanús footballers
Colo-Colo footballers
Sakaryaspor footballers
C.D. Veracruz footballers
Tecos F.C. footballers
Club de Gimnasia y Esgrima La Plata footballers
L.D.U. Quito footballers
San Martín de San Juan footballers
Expatriate footballers in Chile
Expatriate footballers in Ecuador
Expatriate footballers in Mexico
Expatriate footballers in Turkey
Expatriate footballers in Bulgaria
Argentine Primera División players
Liga MX players
First Professional Football League (Bulgaria) players
Süper Lig players
Chilean Primera División players
Argentine expatriate sportspeople in Mexico
Argentine expatriate sportspeople in Turkey
Argentine football managers
Club Atlético Independiente managers
Argentine expatriate sportspeople in Chile